KSBC may refer to:

 KSBC (FM), a radio station (88.3 FM) licensed to serve Nile, Washington, United States
 Kent School Boat Club